Manor Community Academy is a secondary school in the Owton Manor area of Hartlepool, County Durham. It is an academy school which caters for students aged 11 to 16. It is part of the Northern Education Trust. The school has approximately 1050 students.

History
Manor Community Academy was established in 2016, when taken over by multi-academy trust, Northern Education Trust. Before 2016, it stood as local authority owned, Manor College of Technology. As of May 2022, the old swimming pool has been demolished.

Senior leadership team
Manor Community Academy is run by Northern Education Trust, with Joanna Macaulay as acting principal since February 2022.

School achievement and OFSTED Ratings

Northern Education Trust, Manor Community Academy, is Hartlepool's highest performing school, and as of September 2021, was rated 'GOOD' by OFSTED, an improvement from 2018 when it was given a 'requires improvement' rating.

References

External links

Secondary schools in the Borough of Hartlepool
Academies in the Borough of Hartlepool
Northern Education Trust schools